Steward Health Care is the largest physician-owned private for-profit health care network in the United States and attends to 2.2 million people during more than twelve million physician and hospital visits annually. Headquartered in Dallas, Steward's integrated health care model employs 40,000 people at thirty-nine hospitals and hundreds of urgent care, skilled nursing, and primary and specialty care medical practice locations across nine states. Steward Health Care is led by CEO Ralph de la Torre, a Cuban-American physician, engineer and cardiac surgeon.

History
Steward Health Care was started by Ralph de la Torre, when Caritas Christi Health Care system was sold to the private equity firm Cerberus Capital Management in 2010; after the transaction, Caritas was converted to a for-profit company and renamed Steward Health Care.

In June 2020, Steward became the nation's largest physician-owned health care system, after Steward physicians acquired a 90 percent controlling interest in the company.

The company covers approximately three million full-risk patients through its integrated care network, hospitals, managed care and health insurance services in Arizona, Arkansas, Florida, Louisiana, Massachusetts, New Hampshire, New Jersey, Ohio, Pennsylvania, Texas, and Utah.

In September 2016, The Boston Globe reported Steward Health Care System had made a deal to expand its operations. Steward lined up $1.25 billion from a real estate investment firm that will help the Boston-based company finance a national expansion, pay off debt, and return money to the private equity firm that bought it in 2010. Steward said Medical Properties Trust would buy all of its hospital properties for $1.2 billion, lease the properties back to Steward, and pay $50 million for a five percent equity stake in the company. The deal became final in September, 2017.

In February 2017, Steward Health Care acquired eight hospitals from Community Health Systems, including three hospitals in Ohio, two in Pennsylvania and three in Florida.

In May 2017, Steward announced a proposed merger with Iasis Healthcare, headquartered in Franklin, Tennessee, making Steward the largest private for-profit hospital operator in the United States. The merger made Steward the parent organization to thirty six hospitals across ten states, with revenues of nearly $8 billion.

In October 2017, Steward completed its acquisition of eighteen Iasis Healthcare hospitals in a deal that was reportedly for $2 billion.

In February 2018, Steward announced that its top management will move to Dallas, Texas from Boston.

In August 2021, Steward closed a $1.1 billion deal to acquire five South Florida hospitals from Dallas-based Tenet Healthcare.

In April 2022, Steward acquired the former Miami Medical Center property from Nicklaus Children’s Health System.

In February 2023, the Maltese Courts annulled a "fraudulent" privatisation deal for three hospitals, returning them to the government within three months. The court delivered one of the longest Maltese sentences ever with a 140 page judgment. This comes after Vital Global Health Care was handed over to Steward Health Care.

Business model 
Steward intended to become a low-price leader in the provision of high quality care. Consistent with this model, the System had taken steps to reduce the direction of surgical patients toward teaching hospitals in the Boston area. The System has also worked with payers to negotiate patient group-oriented budget pricing.

Steward comprises Steward Medical Group and Steward Health Care Network, its network of primary care and specialty providers.

Additional Steward services include Steward Health Choice, a managed risk platform which covers lives in Arizona, Massachusetts and Utah.

Hospitals

See also 
Partners HealthCare

References

Further reading 

Hospital networks in the United States
Healthcare in Boston
Economy of Boston
Cerberus Capital Management companies
Healthcare in Texas
Medical and health organizations based in Texas